Mahasamund is a Lok Sabha parliamentary constituency in the Indian state of Chhattisgarh.

Vidhan Sabha segments
Mahasamund Lok Sabha constituency (महासमुंद) is composed of the following assembly segments:

Members of Lok Sabha

^ by poll

General elections results

2019 Lok Sabha Elections

General elections 2014

General elections 2009

1977 Lok Sabha Elections
 Brijlal Verma	(BLD / Janata Party) : 182,054 votes     
 Shrikrishna Agrawal (INC): 102,527

See also
 Mahasamund
 List of Constituencies of the Lok Sabha

References

Lok Sabha constituencies in Chhattisgarh
Mahasamund district
Dhamtari district
Raipur district